Jefferson Township is one of nine townships in Whitley County, Indiana, United States. As of the 2010 census, its population was 2,182 and it contained 888 housing units.

Geography

Unincorporated towns
 Dunfee at 
 Raber at 
 Saturn at 
(This list is based on USGS data and may include former settlements.)

Adjacent townships
 Union Township (north)
 Lake Township, Allen County (northeast)
 Aboite Township, Allen County (east)
 Jackson Township, Huntington County (south)
 Clear Creek Township, Huntington County (southwest)
 Washington Township (west)
 Columbia Township (northwest)

Cemeteries
The township contains two cemeteries: Bayliss and Broxon.

Major highways
  U.S. Route 24
  Indiana State Road 14
  Indiana State Road 114

Airports and landing strips
 Homestead Airport

References
 
 United States Census Bureau cartographic boundary files

External links
 Indiana Township Association
 United Township Association of Indiana

Townships in Whitley County, Indiana
Townships in Indiana